In set theory and related branches of mathematics, a collection  of subsets of a given set  is called a family of subsets of , or a family of sets over  More generally, a collection of any sets whatsoever is called a family of sets, set family, or a set system.

The term "collection" is used here because, in some contexts, a family of sets may be allowed to contain repeated copies of any given member, and in other contexts it may form a proper class rather than a set.

A finite family of subsets of a finite set  is also called a hypergraph. The subject of extremal set theory concerns the largest and smallest examples of families of sets satisfying certain restrictions.

Examples

A subset of  having  elements is called a -subset of  
The -subsets  of a set  form a family of sets. 

The class  of all ordinal numbers is a large family of sets. That is, it is not itself a set but instead a proper class.

Properties

Any family of subsets of a set  is itself a subset of the power set  if it has no repeated members. 

Any family of sets without repetitions is a subclass of the proper class of all sets (the universe). 

Hall's marriage theorem, due to Philip Hall, gives necessary and sufficient conditions for a finite family of non-empty sets (repetitions allowed) to have a system of distinct representatives.

If  is any family of sets then  denotes the union of all sets in  where in particular,  

Related concepts

Certain types of objects from other areas of mathematics are equivalent to families of sets, in that they can be described purely as a collection of sets of objects of some type:
 A hypergraph, also called a set system, is formed by a set of vertices together with another set of hyperedges, each of which may be an arbitrary set. The hyperedges of a hypergraph form a family of sets, and any family of sets can be interpreted as a hypergraph that has the union of the sets as its vertices.
 An abstract simplicial complex is a combinatorial abstraction of the notion of a simplicial complex, a shape formed by unions of line segments, triangles, tetrahedra, and higher-dimensional simplices, joined face to face. In an abstract simplicial complex, each simplex is represented simply as the set of its vertices. Any family of finite sets without repetitions in which the subsets of any set in the family also belong to the family forms an abstract simplicial complex.
 An incidence structure consists of a set of points, a set of lines, and an (arbitrary) binary relation, called the incidence relation, specifying which points belong to which lines. An incidence structure can be specified by a family of sets (even if two distinct lines contain the same set of points), the sets of points belonging to each line, and any family of sets can be interpreted as an incidence structure in this way.
 A binary block code consists of a set of codewords, each of which is a string of 0s and 1s, all the same length. When each pair of codewords has large Hamming distance, it can be used as an error-correcting code. A block code can also be described as a family of sets, by describing each codeword as the set of positions at which it contains a 1.

Covers and topologies

A family of sets is said to  a set  if every point of  belongs to some member of the family. 
A family is called a  if every point of  lies in only finitely many family members.

A family is called  if each point in the space has a neighborhood that intersects only finitely many family members.

Special types of set families

A Sperner family is a set family in which none of the sets contains any of the others. Sperner's theorem bounds the maximum size of a Sperner family.

A Helly family is a set family such that any minimal subfamily with empty intersection has bounded size. Helly's theorem states that convex sets in Euclidean spaces of bounded dimension form Helly families.

A matroid is an abstract simplicial complex with an additional property called the augmentation property. 

Every filter is a family of sets.

A convexity space is a set family closed under arbitrary intersections and unions of chains (with respect to the inclusion relation).

Other examples of set families are independence systems, greedoids, antimatroids, and bornological spaces.

See also

 
 
 
 
 
 
 
 
 
 
  (or Set of sets that do not contain themselves)

Notes

References

External links

 

Basic concepts in set theory